Deh Kohneh-ye Kamarej (also Romanized as Deh Kohneh-ye Kamarej; also known as Deh Kohneh) is a village in Kamarej Rural District, Kamarej and Konartakhteh District, Kazerun County, Fars Province, Iran. At the 2006 census, its population was 524, in 104 families.

References 

Populated places in Kazerun County